Ağrı Spor Kulübü, colloquially known as Ağrıspor, was a Turkish professional football club located in Ağrı. The club competed in varied levels of Turkish football league system, most notably in at TFF First League between 1998 and 2001. The club was dissolved in 2008.

History

Ağrıspor was founded in 1970.  They competed in amateur level until 1984. Collecting 71 points in 30 games, they finished the Group 1 (total of 8 groups) of 1997–98 Turkish Third Football League at first place, 14 points adrift Silopi Belediyespor, winning the first and only title of the club amongst the professional leagues. Competing at Group 5 and gaining oly 9th place out of 10 with 30 points in 18 games, they relegated in 2001–02 TFF First League.

Team records

League affiliation
TFF First League: 1998–2001
TFF Second League: 1984–1993, 1994–1998, 2001–2002
TFF Third League: 2002–2003
Turkish Regional Amateur League: 1970–1984, 1993–1994, 2003–2008

Honours
TFF Third League
Winner: 1997–98 (Group 1)

References

External links
Ağrıspor at TFF

Association football clubs established in 1970
Association football clubs disestablished in 2008
Defunct football clubs in Turkey
TFF Third League clubs
1970 establishments in Turkey
2008 disestablishments in Turkey
Ağrı